Hugh Scaife (12 April 1930 – 25 June 2009) was a British set decorator. He was nominated for three Academy Awards in the category Best Art Direction.

Selected filmography
Scaife was nominated for three Academy Awards for Best Art Direction:
 The Spy Who Loved Me (1977)
 The Elephant Man (1980)
 A Passage to India (1984)

References

External links

British set decorators
1930 births
2009 deaths